Daddy DJ is a French dance act consisting of David Le Roy and Jean-Christophe Belval.

Musical career
David Le Roy and Jean-Christophe Belval first met at the French sound engineering school in Paris, where Berval was teaching while Le Roy was a student. They got along so well that they soon founded their own music project Daddy DJ. They were soon joined by Charly Merkiled, who originates from Martinique.

Their debut self-titled single "Daddy DJ", released in April 2000, became a hit across Europe. It reached 2nd position in the French top 100 for almost 5 months. In Germany the song reached 7th place, while in Switzerland the song reached 22nd place in the charts, in addition to the singles The Girl In Red (41) and Over You (96). In Austria, it reached 8th position. The song was also very successful in Northern Europe, topping the charts in Sweden and Norway and peaking at #2 in Denmark and at #3 in Finland. Their later singles "The Girl in Red" and "Over you" proved less popular though, and they remained a one-hit wonder in most countries. In 2012, they recorded a new album called Folder, which also failed to find commercial success.

It is unknown what the future of this group will be since they have not released any new music or interacted with the public since 2012.

Character 
Many of Daddy DJ's music videos feature a 13-year-old boy character known as Kross. He is depicted in the music videos as a child DJ prodigy who is more adept at DJing than his father.

Discography

Studio albums
 2001: Let Your Body Talk
 2012: Folder
 2024: Rendez Vous

Singles

References

External links
 Daddy DJ on Myspace

French DJs
French dance music groups
French Eurodance groups
Musical groups from Paris